Kolami (Northwestern Kolami) is a tribal Central Dravidian language spoken in Maharashtra and Telangana states of India. It falls under the Kolami–Naiki group of languages. It is the most widely spoken Central Dravidian language.

Sathupati Prasanna Sree has developed a unique script for use with the language.

Phonology

References

Agglutinative languages
Dravidian languages
Languages of Andhra Pradesh
Endangered languages of India